Ricardo Santos Lago (born 10 September 1980), best known as Ricardo Baiano, is a retired professional football midfielder who is currently the Youth Academy Manager of FC Krasnodar. Born in Brazil, he represented the Bosnia and Herzegovina national team.

Playing career

International
He has played once for the Bosnia and Herzegovina national football team, coming on as a second half substitute for Elvir Baljić in a World Cup qualification game against Serbia and Montenegro on 9 October 2004.

Management & coaching career
In May 2013, Baiano was appointed as Youth Academy Manager of his former club FC Krasnodar.

Personal life
Ricardo Baiano was born in Ilhéus, a major city located in the southern coastal region of Bahia, Brazil, 430 km south of Salvador, the state's capital.  His brother, Wagner Santos Lago is also a footballer.

Career Stats

References

External links

 CBF 

1980 births
Living people
People from Ilhéus
Brazilian emigrants to Bosnia and Herzegovina
Association football midfielders
Brazilian footballers
Bosnia and Herzegovina footballers
Bosnia and Herzegovina international footballers
Londrina Esporte Clube players
São Paulo FC players
NK Široki Brijeg players
FC Kuban Krasnodar players
PFC Spartak Nalchik players
FC Moscow players
FC Krasnodar players
FC Zhemchuzhina Sochi players
FC Khimki players
Premier League of Bosnia and Herzegovina players
Russian Premier League players
Russian First League players
Brazilian expatriate footballers
Bosnia and Herzegovina expatriate footballers
Expatriate footballers in Russia
Brazilian expatriate sportspeople in Russia
Bosnia and Herzegovina expatriate sportspeople in Russia
Sportspeople from Bahia